DAT or Dat may refer to:

Biology
 Direct agglutination test, any test that uses whole organisms as a means of looking for serum antibody
 Direct antiglobulin test, one of two Coombs tests
 Dopamine transporter or dopamine active transporter, a membrane-spanning protein

Education
 Dental Admission Test, taken by dental school candidates the US and Canada
 Design and Technology, school subject in primary and secondary school

Technology
 .dat, computer filename extension, typically for a file considered to contain data
 dat (software), a decentralized data tool for distributing data small and large.
 DAT Solutions, or Dial-A-Truck, provider of electronic transportation information
 Digital Audio Tape, an audio recording and playback medium
 Double acting tanker, a type of icebreaking tanker ship
 Dynamic Acceleration Technology, increases single-threaded performance on multi-core processors
 Dynamic Address Translation, IBM's term for virtual memory mapping: Virtual memory#History

Transport
 DAT Danish Air Transport, an airline based in Vamdrup, Denmark
 DAT, the IATA code for Datong Yungang Airport in Shanxi Province, China
 DAT, the National Rail code for Datchet railway station in the county of Berkshire, UK
 Delta Air Transport, former Belgian airline
  Delivered at Terminal, a former Incoterms term whereby the seller pays all transport costs

Media and entertainment
 Day After Tomorrow (band), a 3-member J-pop band under the Avex label
 "Dat", a song recorded by Pluto Shervington
DAT (newspaper), a Kazakh news source

Other
 Abbreviation for grammatical dative case
 Desk appearance ticket, a New York order to appear in criminal court
 Disaster Action Team, the local disaster response unit of the American Red Cross
 Drug action teams, involved in applying UK drugs policy
 Dolphin-assisted therapy, swimming with dolphins as a therapy
 DAT (chemotherapy)  is a regimen that consists of Daunorubicin, Ara-C (cytarabine) and Thioguanine
 Divergent Association Test (DAT) is a psychological creativity test

See also